The Badminton Pan Am (BPA) organisation is the governing body for the sport of badminton in the Americas and is recognized as such by the Badminton World Federation - BWF. It was founded as a continental governing body on February 13, 1976 in the headquarters of the Mexican Olympic Committee in Mexico City. The Pan American Badminton Confederation was founded by Badminton Canada, the Jamaica Badminton Association, Federacion Mexicana de Badminton, Comision Nacional de Badminton Peru and the United States Badminton Association.  
BPAC was founded in Mexico City in 1976 and had nominated Victor Jaramillo of Mexico as President until an official election was scheduled to take place at the first Pan Am Championships the following year. The first Badminton Pan Am Championships was held in Moncton, New Brunswick-Canada, in April 1977.

Jaramillo was confirmed as president and stayed in position until 1981. During these five years, the Pan American Badminton Championships were held in Canada, Peru, Mexico, and USA. As far as Pan Am Junior Championships, they were held in Mexico, Canada, USA and Peru. From 1981 to 1987, there was no contest until November 1987 when the V Pan Am Badminton Championships was held in Lima, Peru.

Outstanding efforts were made by Helen Baxter of Canada trying to reactivate the Pan American Badminton Confederation since 1982 and also with the help on the part of the Badminton Peru National Commission President, Mr. José Andrés Bellido, Badminton Pan Am, once again, became an active member of the then International Badminton Federation in 1987. During the 5th Badminton Pan Am Championships, held in Lima, Peru, in November 1987, there was a congress to re-establish Pan Am Badminton Confederation. At the Thomas and Uber Cup preliminaries for the Pan Am Continent in February 1988, Canadian Pierre Blouin was elected president.

The mission of the Badminton Pan Am includes promoting the sport, organizing regional tournaments, certifying referees and umpires, maintaining a set of unified rules, and providing a forum for member nations. There are now currently 37 member associations and its headquarters are now located in Lima, Peru.

Following a general meeting held in Campinas, Brazil back in November, 2006, the confederation decided to change the name from Pan American Badminton Confederation to Badminton Pan Am.

Member associations
Badminton Pan Am has 37 member associations:

Argentina
Aruba
Barbados
Bermuda
Brazil
Bolivia
Canada
Cayman Islands
Chile
Colombia
Costa Rica
Cuba
Curaçao
Dominican Republic
Ecuador
El Salvador
Falkland Islands
French Guiana (associate member)
Grenada
Guadeloupe (associate member)
Guatemala
Guyana
Haiti
Honduras
Jamaica
Martinique (associate member)
Mexico
Panama
Paraguay
Peru
Puerto Rico
Saint Lucia
Suriname
Trinidad and Tobago
United States
Uruguay
Venezuela

Badminton Pan Am Presidents

Tournaments 
Pan Am Badminton Championships
Pan Am Junior Badminton Championships

References

External links 
 
Official page at Facebook

Badminton organizations
Pan-American sports governing bodies
Badminton World Federation
Badminton tournaments in North America
Badminton in South America
1976 establishments in North America
1976 establishments in South America